Delaps Cove is a community in the Canadian province of Nova Scotia, located in Annapolis County. It is on the shore of the Bay of Fundy by a cove of the same name.

References

Communities in Annapolis County, Nova Scotia
General Service Areas in Nova Scotia